In probability and statistics, the inverse-chi-squared distribution (or inverted-chi-square distribution)  is a continuous probability distribution of a positive-valued random variable. It is closely related to the chi-squared distribution.  It arises in Bayesian inference, where it can be used as the prior and posterior distribution for an unknown variance of the normal distribution.

Definition

The inverse-chi-squared distribution (or inverted-chi-square distribution )  is the probability distribution of a random variable whose multiplicative inverse (reciprocal) has a chi-squared distribution. It is also often defined as the distribution of a random variable whose reciprocal divided by its degrees of freedom is a chi-squared distribution. That is, if  has the chi-squared distribution with  degrees of freedom, then according to the first definition,  has the inverse-chi-squared distribution with  degrees of freedom; while according to the second definition,  has the inverse-chi-squared distribution with  degrees of freedom. Information associated with the first definition is depicted on the right side of the page.

The first definition yields a probability density function given by

while the second definition yields the density function

Further,  is the gamma function. Both definitions are special cases of the scaled-inverse-chi-squared distribution. For the first definition the variance of the distribution is  while for the second definition .

Related distributions

scaled-inverse chi-squared: If , then 
 Inverse chi-squared distribution is a special case of type 5 Pearson distribution

See also
Scaled-inverse-chi-squared distribution
Inverse-Wishart distribution

References

External links
 InvChisquare in geoR package for the R Language.

Continuous distributions
Exponential family distributions
Probability distributions with non-finite variance